Bryce Dallas Howard (born March 2, 1981) is an American actress and director. Howard was born in Los Angeles and attended New York University's Tisch School of the Arts, leaving in 2002 to take roles on Broadway but graduating in 2020. While portraying Rosalind in a 2003 production of As You Like It, Howard caught the attention of director M. Night Shyamalan, who cast her as the blind daughter of a local chief in the psychological thriller The Village (2004). She later starred in the leading role of a naiad who escapes from a fantasy world in Shyamalan's fantasy thriller Lady in the Water (2006).

Howard's performance in Kenneth Branagh's As You Like It (2006) earned a Golden Globe Award nomination and she subsequently appeared as Gwen Stacy in Sam Raimi's superhero film Spider-Man 3 (2007). She went on to appear as Kate Connor in the action film Terminator Salvation (2009) and as Victoria in the fantasy film The Twilight Saga: Eclipse (2010), both of which were successful but garnered mixed reviews from critics. Howard's roles as a "fair-weather" girlfriend in the comedy-drama 50/50 (2011) and as a racist socialite in the period-drama The Help (2011) brought praise.

Recognition of Howard widened when she co-starred as Claire Dearing in the adventure film Jurassic World (2015), and its sequels Jurassic World: Fallen Kingdom (2018) and Jurassic World Dominion (2022), the first two of which rank as her most successful films. She also portrayed a forest ranger in the adventure film Pete's Dragon (2016) and Sheila Dwight, Elton John's mother,  in the biopic Rocketman (2019), voicing Yaddle in Tales of the Jedi (2022).

Howard directed the documentary Dads (2019), and episodes of the Disney+ space western series The Mandalorian (2019–) and The Book of Boba Fett (2022). Her father is actor and filmmaker Ron Howard and she is married to actor Seth Gabel, with whom she has two children.

Early life and education
Bryce Dallas Howard was born March 2, 1981, in Los Angeles, California, to writer Cheryl Howard and actor-director Ron Howard. She has two younger sisters; twins Jocelyn and Paige, and a younger brother named Reed. Through her father, Bryce is a granddaughter of actors Rance Howard and Jean Speegle Howard, as well as a niece of actor Clint Howard. Her godfather is actor Henry Winkler, who co-starred with her father in the 1970s–1980s American comedy television series Happy Days.

Howard was raised in Westchester County, New York, and on a farm in Greenwich, Connecticut. Howard and her siblings were raised away from the world of show business; their parents did not allow them access to television, and instead encouraged outdoor activities and hobbies. At the age of seven, she was permitted to be an extra in her father's films. In a 2017 appearance on Watch What Happens Live with Andy Cohen, she said she and her siblings were babysat by family friend Tom Cruise on several occasions.

Howard began training as an actor at Stagedoor Manor, a performing arts camp in upstate New York, alongside Natalie Portman. Howard attended Greenwich Country Day School until 1996, and graduated from Byram Hills High School in 1999, after which she studied for three years at New York University's (NYU) Tisch School of the Arts, taking classes at the Stella Adler Studio of Acting, the Experimental Theatre Wing, and the International Theatre Workshop in Amsterdam. During her schooling, Howard took part in the concept recording of the Broadway-bound musical A Tale of Two Cities. She took a leave of absence from NYU to pursue roles without completing her degree. Decades later, she returned to NYU and completed her degree in 2020.

Howard is also an alumna of the Steppenwolf Theatre Company's School in Chicago, and of The Actors Center in New York City. During her time in New York, Howard was also a member of Theater Mitu, a company that was in residence at New York Theatre Workshop, which is known for its exploration of theatrical forms.

Career

2002–2006: Early roles and film success

For several years, Howard appeared in  New York City theatrical productions; her repertoire included House & Garden–a 2002 Alan Ayckbourn production held at the Manhattan Theatre Club– and Tartuffe, a theatrical comedy staged at the American Airlines Theatre. In 2003, Howard performed as Rosalind in the William Shakespeare comedy As You Like It at The Public Theater, where she caught the attention of film director M. Night Shyamalan, who two weeks later and without an audition, later cast her in his fantasy thriller The Village (2004). Howard portrayed the female lead Ivy, the chief's blind daughter, opposite Ivy's love interest Joaquin Phoenix. The film was a commercial success but met mixed reviews. Her performance was lauded by critics and Howard was nominated for several awards. Lars von Trier then cast Howard to replace Nicole Kidman in Manderlay (2005), the sequel to Dogville (2003); she reprised Kidman's role as Grace Mulligan, an idealistic woman who stays at a plantation in rural Alabama and later attempts to assist a revolt against slave owners. The film garnered mixed reviews.

Howard reunited with Shyamalan for Lady in the Water (2006), a fantasy drama in which she plays Story, a naiad-like being from a bedtime story, opposite Paul Giamatti, a Philadelphia building superintendent who discovers Story in a pool. The film under-performed at the box office, failed to recoup its budget, and was largely panned by critics. Howard again portrayed Rosalind in Kenneth Branagh's 2006 film adaptation of Shakespeare's As You Like It, which was released theatrically in Europe before premiering on HBO in the United States. The film was negatively received by British media but American press coverage was positive. Howard was nominated for a Golden Globe Award for Best Actress – Miniseries or Television Film at the 65th Golden Globe Awards for her role. That year, she wrote and directed a short film called Orchids as part of Glamour magazine's "Reel Moments" series, which was funded by Cartier and FilmAid International.

2007–2014: Rise to prominence and critical acclaim 

In 2007, Howard starred in her first blockbuster film, portraying Gwen Stacy in Spider-Man 3. Howard described herself as a "huge fan" of the franchise and did extensive research to prepare for the role, including reading comic books and dyeing her hair blonde for the part. Howard performed many of her own stunts while filming, unaware she was a few months into a pregnancy. The film was the highest-grossing installment of the trilogy and received a mixed reception. Howard then starred in Terminator Salvation (2009); she replaced Claire Danes in the role of Kate Connor. Howard described her role as "an emotional sounding board" for other characters. The film was a financial success but was not critically well received. The Guardian described Howard's role as "winsomely" while The New York Times wrote she "upholds the maternal side of the original Sarah Connor legacy".

Howard starred as a reluctant debutante opposite Chris Evans in The Loss of a Teardrop Diamond (2009), an independent film that is based on a 1957 screenplay by Tennessee Williams and premiered at the Toronto International Film Festival. Kirk Honeycutt of The Hollywood Reporter praised Howard's "eye-catching performance", describing her as a "must-see", while Roger Ebert of the Chicago Sun-Times called her performance "affecting" but not "electrifying, because the material doesn't have it". She joined the Twilight series' third installment The Twilight Saga: Eclipse, replacing Rachelle Lefevre as Victoria Sutherland, a revenge-seeking vampire. Howard was a fan of the book series and expressed admiration for her character. The film was a box office hit and drew mixed reviews, though Howard's performance received critical acclaim; Honeycutt lauded her as "the epitome of sensual, feline cunning".

Howard appeared in Clint Eastwood's Hereafter (2010) as a love interest of Matt Damon's character. Empire referred to her character as "twinkly", and stated Howard's and Damon's "fine work" uplift the film. Hereafter was a commercial hit but critics gave it a mixed reception. In January 2011, Howard became the first celebrity ambassador for designer Kate Spade. She appeared in Tate Taylor's 2011 film adaptation of Kathryn Stockett's novel The Help, in which she played Hilly Holbrook, a racist socialite who leads a Junior League chapter in 1963 Jackson, Mississippi. The film was a critical and commercial success. The Miami Herald described her role as a "broadly comic villain" while The New York Times praised Howard for being "energetic in a thankless role". Howard was nominated for numerous accolades, including an MTV Movie Award and a NAACP Image Award, winning a Critics' Choice Award and a Screen Actors Guild Award alongside the rest of the cast.

Howard, alongside her father, produced Gus Van Sant's Restless (2011), a dark coming-of-age movie about a teenage boy and girl who are engrossed with death. Howard offered considerable input on the film's screenwriting and directorial choices. It premiered at the Cannes Film Festival to mixed reviews. She portrayed Joseph Gordon-Levitt's on-and-off girlfriend in the cancer dramedy 50/50 (2011). The film premiered at the Toronto International Film Festival to critical acclaim and was nominated for the Golden Globe Award for Best Motion Picture – Musical or Comedy. The New York Times stated Howard "makes a real character" out of the "shrewish" role while Los Angeles Times wrote she was "rapidly becoming today's preeminent Queen of Mean". Howard directed the short film When You Find Me, a social film that was developed in collaboration with Canon under the premise of gathering inspiration through images selected from a photography contest. 96,362 entries were accepted while only eight were selected for use in the film.

2015–present: Mainstream recognition and directorial work

In 2015, Howard starred opposite Chris Pratt, in the science-fiction action film Jurassic World, the fourth installment in the Jurassic Park franchise. She portrayed Claire Dearing, the ambitious, accomplished operations manager at the titular theme park who undergoes development during the film. Howard performed extensive ankle exercises to complete the scenes in which her character runs in high heels through almost  of mud, which she described as "one of the hardest things [she's] ever had to do". Jurassic World was a commercial and critical success, with Howard's performance and on-screen chemistry with Pratt receiving praise. Rolling Stone described her portrayal as "dynamo" and "nobody's patsy" while the Associated Press wrote; "it is Howard who makes the biggest impact ... her transformation is the most convincing one in a film full of dubious evolutions". The Los Angeles Times and The Atlantic considered Dearing and her use of heels "sexist", while Bustle and Inquisitr labeled Howard's character as a "feminist hero". Howard disagreed with the former view, citing the character's detachment from reality and extensive familiarity with heels in everyday life.

In 2016, Howard starred in the fantasy adventure Pete's Dragon, a remake of the 1977 film of the same name. Pete's Dragon was released to critical and commercial success. The same year, Howard appeared in the crime drama Gold (2016) as Kay, the protagonist's girlfriend. Gold opened to a limited release with mixed reviews. The Hollywood Reporter dubbed her portrayal a "sturdy, salt-of-the-earth" type who "makes [a substantial] impression".  That same year, she also appeared in "Nosedive", an episode of the Netflix anthology series Black Mirror. Howard gained 30 pounds for the role because body shaming is a "huge part of the subtext of the story". She chose a laugh for Lacie, her character, that she meant to connote artificiality, anxiety, and dejection. Both Howard and the episode received critical praise; The Guardian lauded her portrayal as "brilliantly played" and The Atlantic wrote "Howard's performance is terrific–she conveys Lacie's inner frustration while grinning cheerfully through it". Howard received a Screen Actors Guild Award nomination for her performance.

Howard reprised her role as Claire in Jurassic World: Fallen Kingdom (2018), in which her character appears as a dinosaur-rights activist; the film was a commercial hit, although it received mixed critical reception. For accuracy, Howard trained with a veterinary surgeon who had experience with African wildlife. Variety stated Howard "projects a luminous concern for God's ancient revived creatures" while Empire praised both Pratt and Howard for "develop[ing] their characters beyond the archetypes they inhabited".

In 2019, Howard voiced the character Bella in A Dog's Way Home, which opened to critical and commercial success.  Howard appeared as Elton John's mother Sheila Dwight in the musical biopic Rocketman (2019), which was directed by Dexter Fletcher. Howard described her character as humorous and sharp-witted, and a s someone who struggled with her mental health. Howard worked extensively with make-up artists to design the character's look as she aged, and used Elizabeth Taylor as inspiration for her portrayal. Rocketman was a box-office hit, garnered critical acclaim, and received a nomination for the Golden Globe Award for Best Motion Picture – Musical or Comedy. The Chicago Sun-Times praised Howard for her "finely nuanced work" and CinemaBlend called her performance a "wicked portrayal ... that really ties a film together".

Howard made her feature-film-directing debut with the documentary Dads, which premiered at the 2019 Toronto International Film Festival, where it was named second runner-up for the People's Choice Award for Documentaries. Dads received critical acclaim; Variety wrote; "Howard favors observation over lecture, anecdotes over numbers, showing instead of telling what equally split primary-caregiving looks like in contemporary households" and The Guardian said the film "mixes the platitudinous with the genuinely moving". She directed two episodes of the Disney+ series The Mandalorian, which premiered in 2019 and 2020. Howard referred to the larger Star Wars universe as an asset to storytelling, and sought to maintain character depth and appeal to viewers. Howard's direction received positive responses; DiscussingFilm stated she "crafts [the episode] to be admirably quaint" and praised her "ecstatic framing" that made for "wholesome visuals" while Den of Geek said she "[made] the episode pop" and "knows what makes Star Wars tick".

Howard directed an episode of The Book of Boba Fett, which premiered on Disney+ on January 26, 2022. Following the episode's premiere, Star Wars fans took to Twitter and called for Howard to direct a trilogy of Star Wars films. She reprised her role as Claire in Jurassic World Dominion (2022).

In July 2021, Howard was cast in the action film Argylle, which is based on Ellie Conway's spy novel of the same name. The same year, Variety reported Howard will direct and produce a remake of family science-fiction adventure Flight of the Navigator (1986), which was rewritten with a female lead.

Personal life
During her senior year of high school, Howard learned of existentialism; she said; "I was like, 'This is it! This is my religion.' I had never felt a connection to any sort of spirituality before that. It was very basic–you're responsible for the choices that you make–but it was mind-blowing at the time."

Howard met actor Seth Gabel at New York University; they dated for five years before marrying on June 17, 2006. Howard and Gabel had planned to start a family together in their thirties but a week after their wedding, Howard learned she was pregnant with their first child. Howard gave birth to their son, Theodore, in 2007. Howard has talked about experiencing postpartum depression 18 months after her son's birth, and credited her recovery to the help of a physician and a therapist. The couple had a second child, daughter Beatrice, in 2012. The family lives in upstate New York.

Filmography

Film

Television

Video games

Theater

Music videos

Audiobooks

Awards and nominations

References

External links

 
 
 

1981 births
Living people
20th-century American actresses
21st-century American actresses
Actresses from Greenwich, Connecticut
Actresses from Los Angeles
Actresses from New York (state)
American child actresses
American film actresses
Audiobook narrators
Bryce Dallas
Outstanding Performance by a Cast in a Motion Picture Screen Actors Guild Award winners
People from Westchester County, New York
Tisch School of the Arts alumni
American television directors
American women television directors